HMS Bacchante (F69) was a  frigate of the Royal Navy. Bacchante was built by Vickers on the Tyne, launched on 29 February 1968 and commissioned on 17 October 1969.

Royal Navy service
In 1970, Bacchante joined Standing Naval Force Atlantic (STANAVFORLANT), with which she visited a variety of ports and performed naval exercises. The following year, in 1971 Bacchante deployed to the West Indies. She acted as West Indies Guardship in 1973. During the same period, she was deployed for the Second and Third Cod Wars as part of the Fishery Protection Squadron.

Bacchante was deployed to the Persian Gulf in 1981 conducting the second ever Armilla patrol taking over from Minerva  visiting the Somali capital of Mogadishu and the Oman capital of Muscat (often drifting in the Indian Ocean to conserve fuel). In 1982, Bacchante became the Gibraltar Guardship and joined the Birmingham group deploying to the South Atlantic to undertake duties during the Falklands War.
Shortly after the war was over the crew was sent ashore to aid the local populace in the disaster recovery operations, providing navigational landmarks for ships located in Stanley Sound and attempting to refloat the high commissioner's barge (but failing); also providing well deserved respite for Royal Marines and navy divers (hot food and accommodation). Whilst trying to erect a navigational radar reflector the team sent ashore, they wandered through a mine field (no injuries received). Some Commanding Officers of note include Julian Oswald and John Brigstocke.

Royal New Zealand Navy service
In 1982 Bacchante was decommissioned from the Royal Navy and subsequently sold to the Royal New Zealand Navy (RNZN). She was renamed . She decommissioned from the RNZN in 2000.

On decommissioning she was bought from the New Zealand Government for one dollar by the "Sink F69 Trust". On 13 November 2005, after cleaning and the removal of all environmentally unfriendly materials, she was sunk as an artificial reef and dive attraction.

References

 hmsbacchante.co.uk. Accessed on 14 March 2006

Publications
 
 Marriott, Leo, 1983.  Royal Navy Frigates 1945-1983, Ian Allan Ltd.  

 

Leander-class frigates
1968 ships
Ships of the Fishery Protection Squadron of the United Kingdom
Ships built on the River Tyne
Ships built by Vickers Armstrong